Fulton Jarvis Redman (March 12, 1885 - September 1969) was a Maine politician and newspaper editor. A Democrat, Redman was born in Ellsworth and served as a member of the Maine House of Representatives from 1916 to 1917. He was twice a delegate to the Democratic National Convention (1924 and (1940). He ran for the U.S. Senate three times (1924 (against Bert M. Fernald), 1926 (against Arthur R. Gould) and 1942 (against Wallace H. White, Jr.). He ran for Governor of Maine in 1940 and lost to Republican Sumner Sewall. He was also the publisher of the Portland Evening News.

He died in 1969.

References

1885 births
1969 deaths
People from Ellsworth, Maine
Democratic Party members of the Maine House of Representatives
American newspaper editors
20th-century American politicians